Amorbia emigratella, the Mexican leaf-roller, is a moth of the family Tortricidae. Although it was described from Hawaii (where it is found on Kauai, Oahu, Molokai, Maui and Hawaii), it is known to be a native of the southern United States, Mexico and Central America. It was first described by August Busck in 1910. 

The length of the forewings is 8–11 mm for males and 11.5–12 mm for females. Adults are pale yellow to brown and may be variably mottled with dark brown. There are multiple generations per year.

The larvae have been recorded on a wide range of plants, including Acacia koaia, Arachis hypogaea, Brassaia, Brassica oleracea, Carica papaya, Cassia leschenaltiana, Citrus sinensis, Dodonaea viscosa, Dracaena, Gardenia, Gliricidia septum, Gossypium, Ipomoea batatas, Lycopersicon esculentum, Macadamia, Orchidaceae, Passiflora, Persea americana, Phais, Phaseolus, Pipturus, Psidium guajava, Rosa, Rubus, Rubus hawaiiensis, Solanum melongena, Solanum tuberosum, Sophora, Theobroma cacao, Ulex europaeus, Wikstroemia foetida and Zea mays. They are leaf-rollers and are often so numerous as to defoliate the trees. They are known to attack the fruit of some plants or web together leaves as well. The larvae are yellowish green and may have dark lateral lines.

Pupation takes place within the folded leaf. The pupa is 9–12 mm long and dark brown to golden brown. The pupal stage takes about 10 days.

References

External links

Fact Sheet

Moths described in 1910
Sparganothini
Moths of North America